Mapp and Lucia is a British television series, set in the fictional Sussex coastal town of Tilling and based on three 1930s novels by E. F. Benson, beginning with Mapp and Lucia. It was produced by London Weekend Television, filmed in Rye (on which Benson based Tilling) and neighbouring Winchelsea in the 1980s, and starred Prunella Scales as Mapp, Geraldine McEwan as Lucia, Nigel Hawthorne as Georgie, and Denis Lill as Major Benjy. The script was by Gerald Savory. There were ten episodes, (which aired in two series of five) broadcast on Channel 4 in 1985 and 1986. These have been repeated over the years, and a new BBC adaptation, Mapp and Lucia, aired in 2014.

Series one is a five-episode adaptation of Mapp and Lucia (1931). Season two adapts both the fifth book (Lucia's Progress, 1935) in the first three episodes, and the sixth book (Trouble for Lucia, 1939) in the final two episodes.

Cast
Prunella Scales as Elizabeth Mapp
Geraldine McEwan as Emmeline Lucas (Lucia)
Nigel Hawthorne as Georgie Pillson
Denis Lill as Major Benjy Flint
Cecily Hobbs as Quaint Irene
Mary MacLeod as Godiva 'Diva' Plaistow
Geoffrey Chater as Algernon Wyse
Marion Mathie as Susan Wyse MBE
James Greene as Rev. Bartlett
Ken Kitson as Cadman 
Lucinda Gane as Foljambe 
Geraldine Newman as Grosvenor
Cherry Morris as Withers
Irene Handl as Poppy, Duchess of Sheffield
Anna Quayle as Olga Bracely
Carol Macready as Daisy Quantock
David Gooderson as Mr. Woolgar

Production
Filming took place in Rye and Winchelsea as well as Kent – Chilham features in episodes 1, 2 and 10, doubling as Risholme and Hever Castle features as the residence of Poppy, Duchess of Sheffield.

Episodes

Series 1 (1985)

Series 2 (1986)

Home releases

References

External links

Tilling on TV - website about the LWT series

Channel 4 television dramas
Television shows based on British novels
Television series set in the 1930s
Television shows set in Sussex
British comedy-drama television shows
English-language television shows
1985 British television series debuts
1986 British television series endings
1980s British comedy-drama television series
Mapp and Lucia